The Temple of Jupiter Victor (Latin: Aedem Iovis Victoris) was a temple on the Palatine Hill of ancient Rome.

History
A temple to the god Jupiter was vowed by Quintus Fabius Maximus Rullianus during the Battle of Sentinum, and was built on the Palatine across from the Temple of Jupiter Stator after 295 BCE. According to Ovid (Fasti IV.621) the day of dedication of the temple was the Ides of April.

It has been assumed that this was the temple that was redesigned during the reign of Domitian as part of his massive rebuilding works on the Palatine, and sat at the entrance of the Domus Augustana beside a monumental arch. Further, it is thought that this was the temple (the Elagabalium) that the emperor Elagabalus rededicated to his god Elagabal, which Severus Alexander subsequently restored back to the worship of Jupiter.

Up until the 1950s, the ruins of the Temple of Apollo Palatinus were believed to have been the remains of this temple.

References
Temples on the Palatine
Roman temples by deity
Victor

Bibliography 
 Claridge, Amanda. Rome, United Kingdom, OUP Oxford, 2010.